Governor Davidson may refer to:

James Alfred Davidson (1921–2004), Governor of the British Virgin Islands from 1978 to 1982
Walter Edward Davidson (1859–1923), Governor of the Seychelles from 1904 to 1912, Governor of Newfoundland from 1913 to 1917, and Governor of New South Wales from 1918 to 1923